Otošče is a settlement in the Municipality of Divača in the Littoral region of Slovenia.

The local church is dedicated to Mary Magdalene and belongs to the Parish of Lozice.

References

External links

Otošče on Geopedia

Populated places in the Municipality of Divača